Hispasthathes is a genus of longhorn beetles of the subfamily Lamiinae.

 Hispasthathes ferruginea Aurivillius, 1926
 Hispasthathes hispoides (Aurivillius, 1911)

References

Astathini
Cerambycidae genera